C/1911 O1 (Brooks), also designated 1911 V or Comet Brooks, was a bright comet discovered in July 1911 by astronomer William Robert Brooks.

It is notable for becoming a bright naked-eye object of second magnitude, with a narrow straight tail of up to thirty degrees in length and a distinct blue colour; this colour seen in some comets is usually a result of the emission of carbon monoxide ions. It was also notable for uniquely being visible at the same time (mid October 1911) and in the same part of the sky as a second bright comet; this was C/1911 S3 (Beljawsky), which reached the first magnitude, had a fifteen degree tail and a bright golden-yellow appearance.

References

External links 
 Orbital elements of C/1911 O1 NASA JPL

Non-periodic comets
19110721